Peter Leigh (born 4 March 1939) was an English professional footballer who played as a defender for Manchester City and Crewe Alexandra.

He made his Crewe debut at Barrow on 19 August 1961, and scored his first Crewe goal on the opening day of the 1967–68 season, in a 1–1 draw against Chesterfield F.C. at Gresty Road on 19 August 1967. He went on to set a record for the most first-team appearances for Crewe (473), surpassing his contemporary Eric Barnes (352), only to then himself be surpassed by his defender team-mate Tommy Lowry in 1977.

Honours
with Crewe Alexandra
Football League Fourth Division fourth-place promotion: 1967–68

References

1939 births
Living people
People from Wythenshawe
English footballers
Association football defenders
Manchester City F.C. players
Crewe Alexandra F.C. players
English Football League players